"Sing girls" is a nickname for actresses who starred alongside Stephen Chow, often as the main character's romantic interest. Many are young, new actresses who go on to receive considerable media attention after appearing in one of Chow's films, and their success is often attributed to the attention brought to them by Chow—Zhang Yuqi, for example, has been referred to as Chow's "protégée" after appearing in the 2007 film CJ7. The Chinese word 星 (xīng) refers both to Chow's nickname 星爷 (Sing Yeh, "Grandmaster Sing") and to 明星 (míngxīng), the word for a star or celebrity.

Chow has not always chosen newcomer actresses to co-star with him; for example, Vicki Zhao already had a successful music and film career when she appeared as the female lead in Shaolin Soccer, and Gong Li was already famous as an "Yimou girl" (谋女郎) for her frequent collaboration with director Zhang Yimou before she starred in two Stephen Chow films in the early 1990s. Many times, though, starring with Chow has been a "Sing girl"'s first major role and has kick-started her career, as King of Comedy did for Cecilia Cheung. Eva Huang and Zhang Yuqi both gained considerable attention from media and netizens after appearing in Kung Fu Hustle and CJ7, respectively, even though their roles were relatively small.

Kingdom Yuen appeared in numerous 1990s Stephen Chow films not as a lead female or romantic interest, but rather in minor roles as a comedic stock character.

The youngest "Sing girl" is 7-year-old Zhang Yuwen, who appears in Journey to the West: Conquering the Demons.

List

See also
Rat Pack, Brat Pack, and Frat Pack: American actors grouped together through frequent collaboration
Bond girl
Yimou girl
Cinema of Hong Kong
Cinema of China

References

20th-century Hong Kong actresses
21st-century Hong Kong actresses